Aingeal O'Donoghue (born 1962) was the first woman ambassador of the Republic of Ireland to the Republic of Korea, taking up the post in August 2013.  She is currently the Director General of the European Union Division in the Department of Foreign Affairs and serves on its management board.  O'Donoghue is a graduate of University College Cork.

References

1962 births
Living people
Ambassadors of Ireland to South Korea
Alumni of University College Cork
Irish women ambassadors